Sugarloaf Township  is the name of several places in the United States:

Sugarloaf Township, Marion County, Arkansas
Sugarloaf Township, Sebastian County, Arkansas
Sugarloaf Township, St. Clair County, Illinois
Sugarloaf Township, Columbia County, Pennsylvania
Sugarloaf Township, Luzerne County, Pennsylvania

See also
Sugarloaf (disambiguation)

Township name disambiguation pages